This article lists events from the year 2019 in Syria.

Incumbents
 President: Bashar al-Assad
 Prime Minister: Imad Khamis

Events
For events related to the Civil War, see Timeline of the Syrian Civil War (January–April 2019), Timeline of the Syrian Civil War (May–August 2019) and Timeline of the Syrian Civil War (September–December 2019)

Deaths
8 June - Abdul Baset al-Sarout, 27, Syrian association football goalkeeper.
27 October - Abu Bakr al-Baghdadi, 48, leader of Islamic State of Iraq and the Levant.

References

 
2010s in Syria
Years of the 21st century in Syria
Syria
Syria